The Berlinische Galerie is a museum of modern art, photography and architecture in Berlin.  It is located in Kreuzberg, on Alte Jakobstraße, not far from the Jewish Museum. The Berlinische Galerie collects art created in Berlin since 1870 with a regional and international focus. Since September 2010, the museum's director has been the art historian Thomas Köhler, until then deputy director, succeeding Jörn Merkert.

History

The Berlinische Galerie was founded in 1975 as a society devoted to exhibiting art from Berlin.  For the first few years it was based in an office in Charlottenburg, and its exhibitions were displayed at the Akademie der Künste and the New National Gallery among others. In 1978 the Galerie moved into a former Landwehr officers' mess (now the Museum of Photography) on Jebensstraße, near Zoo Station.  In 1986 it moved again, into the Martin-Gropius-Bau. In 1994 the collection became a public-law foundation.

In 1998 the Berlinische Galerie had to leave the Martin-Gropius-Bau due to reconstruction. After six years without a permanent home, it opened in its new location, in former industrial premises in Kreuzberg, in 2004. Built in 1965, the current building was originally a glass warehouse, and took the Galerie a year to renovate. The museum reopened again in 2015 following a €6 million refurbishment that mainly involved updating the museum's security and technical equipment.

Collection 
The Berlinische Galerie collects art created in Berlin from the end of the 19th century (since 1870) to the present. The collection is interdisciplinary. Painting, sculpture, installation and media art, graphic art, photography, architecture and the documentary estates of artists are among the holdings. The collection consists of five collection areas: Fine Arts, Prints and Drawings, Photography, Architecture and Artists' Archives.

Fine Arts 
The Fine Arts Collection contains around 5000 objects. Among them are works by prominent artists such as Max Beckmann, Hannah Höch, Naum Gabo, Georg Baselitz, Wolf Vostell, Ursula Sax and John Bock. Works by numerous artist groups are also represented, e.g. the Berlin Secession, Dada Berlin, the Eastern European avant-gardes, the Neue Wilde and the young art scene after the fall of the Berlin Wall in 1989. The Golden Twenties form a focal point.

Prints and Drawings 
The collection Prints and Drawings comprises around 15,000 sheets, including prints and above all drawings. The works represent the diversity of art historical developments in Berlin: from Dada Berlin, late Expressionism from 1914, the Eastern European avant-garde of the 1920s to New Objectivity, New Figuration of the 1960s, East Berlin art since the construction and fall of the Wall, and contemporary drawing.

Photography 
With around 73,000 photographs, the photographic collection is one of the most important in Germany. In addition to portrait, architectural and urban photography, the focus is also on advertising and fashion photography, photojournalistic works, photomontages, photograms and photographic concept works. A special feature is the artistic photography of the GDR. The museum also promotes contemporary Berlin photography through continuous and extensive acquisitions.

Architecture 
The architecture collection comprises around 300,000 plans, 80,000 photographs, 4,000 design cartons for stained glass and mosaics, 2,500 models and around 800 metres of file material from estates, competitions and archives. The materials document Berlin's urban planning and architecture from 1900 to the present.

Artists' Archives 
The collection preserves documentary material on artists, artist groups, gallery owners and art scholars (including the Art Nouveau artist Fidus, the November Group, the Ferdinand Möller Gallery and the sculptors Naum Gabo and Hans Uhlmann). A special focus is the extensive archive holdings on the Berlin DADA movement consisting of the estates of Hannah Höch and Raoul Hausmann.

Exhibitions

Permanet Exhibition 
In October 2020, the tour of the collection was fundamentally renewed and presents art from the painting of the imperial period at the end of the 19th century to works of Expressionism, the Eastern European avant-garde, the architecture of post-war modernism and the Heftige Malerei of the 1970s.

Special Exhibition 
The special exhibition programme on the ground floor ranges from classical modernism to contemporary art in Berlin. These are complemented by series of events with films, concerts, artist talks, curator tours and lectures.

List of special exhibitions (selection) 

 2010/2011: Nan Goldin: Berlin Work. Photographs 1984–2009
 2010/2011: Susanne Kriemann: GASAG Art Prize 2010
 2010/2011: Arno Fischer: Photographs 1953–2006. Hannah-Höch-Award 2010
 2011/2012: Eva Besnyö: Woman Photographer 1910–2003. Budapest – Berlin – Amsterdam. The Berlinische Galerie plays host to Das Verborgene Museum
 2011/2012: J. Mayer H.: RAPPORT. Experiments with Spatial Structure
 2011/2012: Friedrich Seidenstücker: Photographs 1925–1958
 2012: Boris Mikhailov: Time is out of joint. Photography 1966–2011
 2012: Michael Sailstorfer: Forst. Vattenfall Contemporary 2012
 2012/2013: The Shuttered Society. Art Photography in the GDR 1949–1989
 2012/2013: Tue Greenfort: GASAG Art Prize 2012
 2013: Tobias Zielony: Jenny Jenny
 2013/2014: Vienna Berlin. The Art of Two Cities. From Schiele to Grosz (a cooperation with the Austrian museum Belvedere)
 2014: Dorothy Iannone: This Sweetness Outside of Time. Paintings, Objects, Books 1959–2014
 2015: Radically Modern. Urban Planning and Architecture in 1960s Berlin
 2015/2016: Max Beckmann and Berlin
 2016: DADA Africa. Dialogue with the Other (a partnership with the Museum Rietberg in Zurich)
 2016: Heidi Specker: Photographs 2005/2015
 2016: Erwin Wurm: Bei Mutti 
 2016/2017: Cornelia Schleime: A Blink of An Eye. Hannah-Höch-Preis 2016
 2017: John Bock: In the Moloch of the Presence of Being
 2017: Christine Streuli: Fred-Thieler-Preis 2017 
 2017: Faraway Focus. Photographers go travelling (1880–2015)
 2017: Monica Bonvicini: 3612,54 m³ vs 0,05 m³
 2017/2018: Jeanne Mammen: The Observer. Retrospective 1910–1975
 2018: Loredana Nemes: Greed Fear Love. Photographs 2008–2018
 2018: Eduardo Paolozzi: Lots of Pictures – Lots of Fun
 2018/2019: Freedom. The art of the Novembergruppe 1918–1935
 2019: Underground Architecture. Berlin Metro Stations 1953–1994
 2019: André Kirchner. Berlin: The City's Edge 1993/94
 2019: Lotte Laserstein: Face to Face
 2019/2020: Original Bauhaus. The centenary exhibition (a cooperation project with the Bauhaus Archive Berlin, on the occasion of the 100th anniversary of the founding of the Bauhaus)
 2019/2020: Bettina Pousttchi: In Recent Years
 2020: Umbo Photographer. Works 1926–1956
 2020/2021: Drawing the City. Paper-based works 1945 to the Present
 2020/2021: Provenances. Wayfaring Art
 2021/2022: Ferdinand Hodler and Berlin Modernism
 2021/2022: Alicja Kwade: In Abwesenheit (In Absence)
 2021/2022: Louise Stomps: Nature Shapes. Sculptures and Drawings 1928–1988. Das Verborgene Museum as a guest at the Berlinische Galerie
 2022: Fashion–Clothing in Art. Photography, Fine Arts, and Fashion since 1900
 2022: Sibylle Bergemann: Town and Country and Dogs. Photographs 1966–2010
 2022/2023: Magyar Modern. Hungarian Art in Berlin 1910–1933 (a partnership with the Museum of Fine Arts in Budapest – Hungarian National Gallery)

Friends of the Museum: Förderverein 
For over 45 years, the Friends have been supported by around 1700 members (as of 2023), who support the work of the museum primarily financially. This also includes the members of "Jung und Artig", the circle of young friends. In addition to free museum admission, they receive special tours, studio visits, excursions and previews.

See also
 List of art museums
 List of museums in Berlin
 List of museums in Germany

References

Bibliography
 Van Uffelen, Chris. Contemporary Museums – Architecture, History, Collections, Braun Publishing, 2010, pages 222–223.
 Berlinische Galerie (ed.): Berlinische Galerie – Museum für Moderne Kunst, 2014,  (in German).

External links

Home page, including history. 
Berlinische Galerie: Landesmuseum für Moderne Kunst, Fotografie und Architektur History from Berliner Immobilienmanagement. 

Art museums and galleries in Berlin
Modern art museums in Germany
Art museums established in 1975
1975 establishments in Germany
Buildings and structures in Friedrichshain-Kreuzberg